The 2010–11 North Carolina Tar Heels men's basketball team represented the University of North Carolina at Chapel Hill in the 2010–11 NCAA Division I men's basketball season. The head coach was Roy Williams. The team played its home games in the Dean Smith Center in Chapel Hill, North Carolina and is a member of the Atlantic Coast Conference. They finished the season 29–8, 14–2 in ACC play to win the conference regular season championship. They advanced to the championship game of the 2011 ACC men's basketball tournament before falling to Duke. They received an at-large bid in the 2011 NCAA Division I men's basketball tournament where they advanced to the Elite Eight before falling to Kentucky.

This season represented the 101st season of basketball in the school's history.

Preseason 
The team lost seniors Deon Thompson and Marcus Ginyard to graduation, while sophomore Ed Davis made himself available for the 2010 NBA draft.  The team was dealt an unexpected loss as twin freshmen David and Travis Wear announced that they would transfer from UNC on May 6, 2010, ultimately landing at UCLA. Additionally, it was announced in October 2010 that red-shirt senior Will Graves was removed from the team for violating team rules.

Recruiting
Coach Roy Williams signed a three-man class for 2010.

Season
UNC took part in the 2010 Puerto Rico Tip-Off and the ACC – Big Ten Challenge.  The following schools will compete in 2010 Puerto Rico Tip-Off: Davidson, Hofstra, Minnesota, Nebraska, North Carolina, Vanderbilt, West Virginia and Western Kentucky

UNC had already scheduled non-conference games against Kentucky, Texas (in Greensboro), Charleston, Long Beach State, at Illinois, at UNC-Asheville, at Evansville, and at Rutgers (Madison Square Garden).

Non-conference season

UNC beat Lipscomb 84–66 in their first game of the season. In their second game, which was their first game in the Puerto Rico tip-off, they beat Hofstra 108–63. In their third game, they lost to the University of Minnesota 72–67. In their fourth game, they lost to Vanderbilt 72–65. The two losses caused UNC to fall in the rankings to #25. The 2–2 start was their worst since the 2001–02 season. After closer-than-expected wins against UNC Asheville and College of Charleston, UNC dropped out of the rankings.

In their ACC-Big Ten Challenge game, the Tar Heels were throttled on the road against Illinois.  However, they followed up that loss with an epic win over then 11th-ranked Kentucky.  They had a chance to jump back into the rankings with a win over Texas in what was essentially a home game at the Greensboro Coliseum, but lost on a last-second shot by the Longhorns' Cory Joseph.

Conference season
The Tar Heels opened ACC play with close wins over the league's two Virginia teams.  However, they came out decidedly flat against Georgia Tech, losing by 20 points.  They wouldn't lose again for almost a month, with the only really close game in that stretch being against Miami.  That game was only decided on a last-second three-pointer by Harrison Barnes.  The month-long winning streak catapulted them back into the rankings for the first time since December.

On February 4, the Tar Heels were broadsided when point guard Larry Drew II abruptly left the team.  It didn't seem to have any effect at first, as the Tar Heels blew out Florida State in their first game without Drew.  However, after dominating Duke all of the first half, a second-half swoon doomed them to a 79–73 loss.  They wouldn't lose again for over a month, despite nail-biters against Clemson and Florida State.

This set up a regular-season finale against Duke with the winner clinching the ACC regular-season title and the top seed in the 2011 ACC tournament—only the fifth winner-take-all game in the series' 92-season history.  The Tar Heels won with relative ease, 81–67, to win their 28th ACC regular-season title and fifth outright title in seven years.  It also completed the Tar Heels' fourth undefeated season in the Smith Center.

The Tar Heels did not have an easy time of it in the ACC Tournament in Greensboro, despite being the top seed.  In their first-round game against Miami, they trailed for the entire game before going on a 27–6 run in the final 10 minutes, capped by a Tyler Zeller tip-in with 0.2 seconds left to win the game 61–59.  It was the biggest postseason comeback in school history.  Against Clemson, they trailed by as much as 11 before rallying to force overtime, then dominated the extra session to win 92–87.

This set up their third matchup of the season against Duke.  However, the Tar Heels' luck finally ran out, as they were easily swept aside by the Blue Devils 75–58.

NCAA tournament
Despite the loss, the Tar Heels returned to the NCAA tournament after a one-year absence as the No. 2 seed in the East Regional.  They played their first two games at Time Warner Cable Arena in Charlotte.  They played there alongside bitter rival Duke, who is the top seed in the West Regional.

The Heels didn't have an easy time of it in the early rounds, despite playing in a city that is only two hours from campus and is home to a very large alumni and fan base.  In the first game, the Tar Heels got all they could handle from Long Island before pulling away late for a 102–87 win.  They then squeaked by Washington on the strength of a combined 45 points from Zeller and Barnes.  They advanced to the Sweet 16 at the Prudential Center in Newark.

The Tar Heels first faced the 11-seeded Marquette Golden Eagles in the Sweet 16 in Newark.  Marquette had an off night and the Heels dominated their opponent with a score of 81–63.  UNC's next test was against a very hot Kentucky Wildcats team, fresh off a win against the overall number one seed – the Ohio State Buckeyes.  UNC was down early and remained down by 8 at halftime.  Despite the barrage of 3-points from the Wildcats, UNC launched a furious comeback to tie the game late.  Just as UNC was on the verge on overtaking Kentucky, freshman Brandon Knight hit a clutch 3-pointer to put Kentucky on top for good.  Kentucky beat UNC 76–69 to advance to the Final Four in Houston.

Roster 

* Left team February 4, 2011

Schedule

|-
!colspan=9 style=| Exhibition
|-

|-
!colspan=9 style=| Regular Season

|-
!colspan=9 style=| ACC tournament

|-
!colspan=9 style=| NCAA tournament

Blue Steel

In the 2010–2011 season, the term "Blue Steel" was coined to describe the North Carolina Tar Heels men's basketball team walk-ons. Blue Steel is composed of six players who, despite being non-scholarship athletes, have a position on the team and play a key role in its development. They are led by Basketball Hall of Fame coach Roy Williams, who is third all time in the NCAA for winning percentage.

Roster and statistics
Patrick Crouch—a Junior guard
Daniel Bolick—a Senior guard
D.J. Johnston—a Junior forward
Van Hatchell—a Senior forward
David Dupont—a Junior forward
Stewart Cooper—a Junior forward

History

Coinage of name
The term "Blue Steel" was created by walk-on member Stewart Cooper, a 2010–2011 Junior from Forsyth Country Day School, and has quickly gained prominence. Although the players to which it refers were once known by nicknames such as "the JV guys," and "the blue team", the new term of "Blue Steel" is one that is now widely known and used by members of the student body, faculty, and Tar Heel fans. Beyond the local fanbase, sports reporters around the country have begun to use it as well.

The Blue Steel movement first caught on in the 2010–2011 season. At the end of North Carolina’s 84–64 win over N.C. State at the Dean Smith Center on January 29, fans chanted their new group name. The chant was at its optimum in Saturday’s pre-game introductions and when the walk-ons went to cut down the nets after three of them started against Duke on Senior Night.

Players on the name "Blue Steel"

BOLICK: Williams called us a combination of "J.V." or "Parentheses." On the actual practice plans, all the walk-ons' names were on the practice sheets in parentheses next to the player they'd substitute in for. So he'd say, "Parentheses, get in there." We said, "We can't go with being called the parentheses."

COOPER: We didn't want to tell Williams to start calling us [Blue Steel]. We told one of the assistant coaches.

BOLICK: The assistant coaches started calling us Blue Steel at the beginning of the week. By the end of the week, Coach Williams had caught on as well.

COOPER: It was pretty funny the first time he said it. He said he liked it. He's never really gone back.

JOHNSTON: It definitely started off in practice, not as sort of a schtick-type thing, which is what it turned into. When he first said it in a game, we looked at each other like, "Nice."

Significance

Twitter
Blue Steel has approximately 10,000 Twitter fans. They are known for "tweeting from the bench" during basketball games. Their first tweet was on December 15, 2010 and was "What's up world? 2010–11 UNC basketball walk-ons fresh on the twitter scene. stay tuned FRIENDS." Some other examples of Blue Steel tweets are:

• "You're welcome Tar Heel fans. If we didn't get dunked on every day in practice, you wouldn't be able to see it in the game. #feelthesteel"

• "bucket, drawn charge, airball and one of the biggest blocks ever in the nc state game...the world saw all aspects of Steel's game. #respect"

• "We're gonna have a far better view than the "crazies" and we didn't waste all of January sleeping in a tent. #feelthesteel"

Videos
Blue Steel players filmed in action along with comments from members and team players. Submitted with permission from creator.

Playtime in big games
In the rival matchup between North Carolina and Duke University in 2011, Roy Williams started the senior members of Blue Steel.
Harrison Barnes' audio response to question about Blue Steel players: "From the walk-ons starting, to the students rushing the court, is this your finest memory as a Tar Heel thus far?" "Just to see Blue Steel get some recognition out there and be able to start—they work so hard and are the unsung heroes of this team. Then to have them rush the court, we haven't had that happen this year, and it's a great experience to have that, to know that a ring is on the way. That's the best feeling.

In North Carolina's game against Clemson in the ACC tournament in Greensboro, North Carolina, Roy Williams took out all of his scholarship players and put Blue Steel in the game.
Point guard Kendall Marshall said in response to this occurrence,  “Just to sit on the bench and hear coach telling us all of the things we’re doing wrong – in so many words that I can’t say here – to see Blue Steel out there giving it their all, it inspires you.”

Blue Steel had the opportunity to play in the 2011 NCAA tournament in the opening game against Long Island University and in the Sweet 16 game versus Marquette University.
During an NCAA press conference, Kendall Marshall said, "But, still, you've just gotta feel the Steel sometimes. They bring a whole other dimension to this team. They're part of that goofiness that we have. They started a name for themselves, and all the little things that bring us close – it's been great."

Hand signal
Blue Steel have their own hand gesture, called the "dip snap". This gesture is used as a sign of respect when Blue Steel players are entering the game. The steps for completing it are reportedly as follows:

Press your thumb and middle finger together
Let your forefinger fall limp
Raise your hand up and turn your wrist so that your hand faces you
Sling your hand down towards the floor, allowing your forefinger to snap against your other fingers
Repeat until ample signs of respect have been shown

Reporters
Ben Doster--"Blue Steel: New Look to an Old Tradition"

Dave Wilson--"North Carolina's 'Blue Steel' adds to sports pranks"

Dave Wilson--"Blue Steel, North Carolina's Walk-ons, Earn Cult Hero Status"

Conor Orr--"North Carolina vs. Kentucky: Meet 'Blue Steel,' the Tar Heels' humorous, charitable bench"

Adam Lucas--"Lucas: Prank You Very Much"

Jerome Richard--"'Blue Steel' steals the show at start for Tar Heels"

Lennon Dodson--""Blue Steel" emerges as more than just bench warmers"

Jason Jennings--"UNC's Blue Steel builds a brand"

T-shirts
Blue Steel recently released their own T-shirts with the slogan "Feel the Steel". Proceeds from the shirts go to a Camp Kesem North Carolina, a week-long summer camp for youth whose parent or guardian have cancer.

Charity date auction
On February 14, 2011, UNC Chapel Hill held an auction for the charity Dance Marathon. Dates with members of the school's basketball team were auctioned off in order to support the organization, which aims to raise money for sick children. Specifically, members of Blue Steel were auctioned off for $375.

Team players drafted into the NBA

See also
2011 NCAA Division I men's basketball tournament
2010–11 NCAA Division I men's basketball season
2010–11 NCAA Division I men's basketball rankings

References

North Carolina
North Carolina Tar Heels men's basketball seasons
North Carolina
Tar
Tar